Kamisaka (written: 上坂 or 神坂) is a Japanese surname. Notable people with the surname include:

, Japanese writer
, Japanese painter

Japanese-language surnames